Enneüs "Inne" Heerma (23 December 1944 – 1 March 1999) was a Dutch politician of the Christian Democratic Appeal (CDA) party and management consultant.

Heerma applied at the Free University Amsterdam in July 1963 majoring in Political science and obtaining a Bachelor of Social Science degree in June 1965 before graduating with a Master of Social Science degree in July 1970. Heerma worked as a management consultant in Amsterdam from January 1971 until September 1978. Heerma served on the Municipal Council of Amsterdam from March 1971 until July 1986 and served as an Alderman in Amsterdam from September 1978 until July 1986. Heerma served as acting Mayor of Amsterdam from 1 June 1983 until 16 June 1983 following the retirement of Wim Polak.

After the election of 1986 Heerma was appointed as State Secretary for Economic Affairs in the Cabinet Lubbers II, taking office on 17 July 1986. Heerma was appointed as State Secretary for Housing, Spatial Planning and the Environment following the resignation of Gerrit Brokx, taking office on 27 October 1986. The Cabinet Lubbers II fell on 3 May 1989 and continued to serve in a demissionary. Heerma was elected as a Member of the House of Representatives after the election of 1989, taking office on 14 September 1989. Following the cabinet formation of 1989 Heerma continued as State Secretary for Housing, Spatial Planning and the Environment in the Cabinet Lubbers III, taking office on 7 November 1989. After the election of 1994 Heerma returned as a Member of the House of Representatives, taking office on 17 May 1994. After the Leader of the Christian Democratic Appeal and Parliamentary leader of the Christian Democratic Appeal in the House of Representatives Elco Brinkman announced he was stepping down as Leader and Parliamentary leader in the House of Representatives following the defeat in the election, the Christian Democratic Appeal leadership approached Heerma as his successor, Heerma accepted and became the Leader and Parliamentary leader, taking office on 18 August 1994. The Cabinet Lubbers III was replaced by the Cabinet Kok I following the cabinet formation of 1994 on 22 August 1994. On 27 March 1997 following increasing criticism on his performance as Opposition leader Heerma announced he was stepping down Leader and Parliamentary leader but retained his seat in the House of Representatives and continued to serve as a backbencher until his resignation on 9 April 1997.

Heerma remained in active politics, in October 1997 he was nominated as a Mayor of Hilversum but was diagnosed with terminal lung cancer the day before his official conformation, he died two years later at the age of 54.

Heerma was known for his abilities as a manager and policy wonk. His youngest son Pieter is also a politician and is currently serving as the Parliamentary leader of the Christian Democratic Appeal in the House of Representatives, the same office Heerma himself held 22 years earlier.

Decorations

Bridge

References

External links
Official
  Drs. E. (Enneüs) Heerma Parlement & Politiek

1944 births
1999 deaths
Aldermen of Amsterdam
Anti-Revolutionary Party politicians
Christian Democratic Appeal politicians
Commanders Crosses of the Order of Merit of the Federal Republic of Germany
Commanders of the Order of Orange-Nassau
Deaths from cancer in the Netherlands
Deaths from lung cancer
Dutch management consultants
Grand Officers of the Order of Leopold II
Housing reformers
Leaders of the Christian Democratic Appeal
Mayors of Amsterdam
Members of the House of Representatives (Netherlands)
Municipal councillors of Amsterdam
People from Tytsjerksteradiel
Reformed Churches Christians from the Netherlands
State Secretaries for Economic Affairs of the Netherlands
State Secretaries for Housing and Spatial Planning of the Netherlands
Vrije Universiteit Amsterdam alumni
20th-century Dutch politicians